The Atatürk Olympic Stadium is a stadium in Istanbul, Turkey. Located in the western district of İkitelli, it is the largest-capacity stadium in the country. The stadium is named after Mustafa Kemal Atatürk, the founder and first President of the Republic of Turkey. Its construction began in 1999 and was completed in 2002. It was originally built for Turkey's failed bid for the 2008 Olympic Games that were ultimately awarded to Beijing, China. It cost about US$140 million.

With its 74,753 (all-seater) capacity and Olympic size, it was granted the "5-star sports complex" title by the UEFA in 2004, enabling it to host the finals of UEFA events. The 2005 UEFA Champions League Final between Milan and Liverpool was played at the Atatürk Olympic Stadium on 25 May 2005. The stadium is also certified by the IAAF and IOC as a first-class venue for track and field, and has hosted several European athletic competitions. The stadium was originally scheduled to stage its second Champions League final between Paris Saint-Germain and Bayern Munich on 30 May 2020, but following the COVID-19 pandemic in Europe the match was postponed and later rescheduled to August at the Estádio da Luz in Lisbon, Portugal behind closed doors; the stadium was then set to hold the 2021 final between Manchester City and Chelsea instead, but the match was once again moved to Portugal, this time at the Estádio do Dragão in Porto. The stadium is scheduled to host the 2023 UEFA Champions League Final.

Süper Lig football team Istanbul BB used the venue as their home stadium until they moved to the Başakşehir Fatih Terim Stadium in 2014. Galatasaray played its home games at the Atatürk Olympic Stadium during the 2003–2004 football season because their own venue, the Ali Sami Yen Stadium, was under renovation. Galatasaray eventually returned to Ali Sami Yen for the 2004–2005 season, but played 2006–2007 UEFA Champions League group stage matches at the Atatürk Olympic Stadium. Sivasspor also played some of its Süper Lig home games at the Atatürk Olympic Stadium due to bad weather conditions in their original hometown stadium. Beşiktaş used the arena in the 2013–14 season to play most of their home games, with the reasoning being the same as Galatasaray's, while their own stadium, the Vodafone Park, was under construction. Since their promotion to the Süper Lig in 2020, Fatih Karagümrük uses the stadium as its home.

Design and construction
Istanbul Atatürk Olympic Stadium was originally conceived for the city's 2008 Olympic Games bid.

The stadium's two steel roofs (weighing 2,800 t and 1,300 t) were produced by Tekfen's Steel Structure Fabrication Plant in Ceyhan, Adana. The west roof, designed in the form of a crescent and principally composed of a 1,000 t main beam called mega-truss, is supported by two reinforced concrete shafts with 196 m span.

With its 134 entrances and 148 exit gates, the Olympic Stadium allows 80,000 spectators to evacuate within 7.5 minutes, in case of an emergency. Two annex fields (for warm up / training purposes) are connected directly to the Olympic Stadium with a tunnel.

The Olympic Stadium's technical infrastructure and design ensure optimal visibility from all stands; a homogeneous sound level (102 decibels) with modern speaker systems, and a 1,400 lux illumination covering all areas of the stadium.

A 42,200 m2 commercial center is situated under the west roof, with a front facade length of 450 m and a total of 6 floors (3 floors below ground level.)

Renovations and events

2005 UEFA Champions League Final
From 2002 to 2005, the stadium had a capacity of 80,597 (all-seater). This was later reduced to 76,092 (all-seater) by removing the seats from where it was not possible to see the entire pitch, prior to the 2005 UEFA Champions League Final, the final match of Europe's primary club football competition in the 2004–05 season. The showpiece event (dubbed "The Miracle of Istanbul") was contested between Liverpool F.C. of England and A.C. Milan of Italy on 25 May 2005.

UEFA Euro 2016 plans 
The stadium was part of the Turkish UEFA Euro 2016 bid. To meet all requirements of UEFA for being able to organise the championship, the authorities planned to take major reconstruction works on this stadium. It was planned to increase the stadium's capacity to over 90,000 spectators and making it to the world's largest stadium with every seat under cover. To increase the net and gross capacity to 81,106 and 94,555 respectively, the pitch would have been lowered by 2.15 metres. In order to provide better convenience for the VIP guests and the media, all existing hospitality areas at levels 3 and 4 would have been extended. Furthermore, 12 new boxes were planned to be added to the west stand and 32 to the east stand in order to add to the current number of 36 skyboxes; making a total of 80 skyboxes after the reconstruction.

Second UEFA Champions League final
The 2020 UEFA Champions League Final was scheduled to be played at the stadium on 30 May 2020. However the final was postponed due to the COVID-19 pandemic in Europe and later relocated to the Estádio da Luz, Lisbon. It was due to stage the following season's final, however this was relocated by UEFA on 13 May 2021 because of the COVID-19 pandemic in Turkey. On 16 July 2021 UEFA announced that the stadium is scheduled to host the 2023 UEFA Champions League Final.

UEFA Euro 2024 plans 
For the UEFA Euro 2024 bid the Turkish Football Federation planned to rebuild the stadium. The stands would be closer to the pitch, making it a football stadium. Because of the removal of the athletics track, Turkey plans a new Olympic stadium near to Bosphorus for prospects for a future Summer Olympics. The rebuild was made by Manchester-based British architecture company AFL Architects. Ultimately, the Euro 2024 tournament would be awarded to Germany instead.

Concerts

U2 360° Tour
On 6 September 2010, the renowned Irish rock band U2 gave a sold-out concert at the stadium with 54,278 fans in attendance, as a part of their U2 360° Tour, the opening act of which was performed by the group Snow Patrol.

Records

See also
 List of football stadiums in Turkey
 Istanbul bid for the 2020 Summer Olympics

References

External links

 Official website
 Stadium Guide Article
 World Stadiums Article

2002 establishments in Turkey
Başakşehir
İstanbul Başakşehir F.K.
Music venues in Istanbul
Turkey
Sports venues completed in 2003
Sports venues in Istanbul
Süper Lig venues
Stadium